The Battle of Lund, part of the Scanian War, was fought on December 4, 1676, in an area north of the city of Lund in Scania in southern Sweden, between the invading Danish army and the army of Charles XI of Sweden. The Danish had an army of about 13,000 under the personal command of 31-year-old King Christian V of Denmark, aided by General Carl von Arensdorff. The Swedish army, which numbered about 8,000, was commanded by Field Marshal Simon Grundel-Helmfelt and the 21-year-old Swedish king Charles XI. It is one of the bloodiest battles in percent of casualties on both sides ever fought in Scandinavia.

Events leading up to the battle
After the Swedish defeat at the Battle of Fehrbellin and a number of Danish triumphs at sea, the Swedish military was occupied retaining their tenuous hold on dominions in Brandenburg and Pomerania.

The Danes saw this as an opportunity to regain control over the Scanian lands, which had fallen to Sweden with the 1658 Treaty of Roskilde. The Danes invaded via Helsingborg in late June 1676 with an army of 14,000 men, where they found themselves supported by the local peasantry. This made it impossible for the outnumbered Swedish troops to effectively defend the recently acquired province. After a month, only the fortified town of Malmö remained under Swedish control.

In August, a Danish detachment tried to advance north, but Swedish King Charles XI had prepared a new army in the province of Småland, and the Danish advance was halted at the Battle of Halmstad. The Swedes had gathered 14,000 men by October, of which three-fourths were mounted, and felt confident enough to march south. They slowly fought their way in an attempt to break the siege of Malmö. Swedish supply lines were thin due to frequent interceptions by local peasants under the command of Danish officers.

In early November, the Danish king and his army had taken post at Lund, south of the Kävlinge River. The Danes controlled all the river crossings, and the Swedish army was forced to camp on the north side. For one month this situation endured, but snow arrived in late November, and the river surface began to freeze. On the morning of December 3, the Swedish General of Fortifications Erik Dahlberg reported to the king that the ice would hold their weight. The Danes assumed that the Swedes had gone into winter camp and that they would not attack until spring.

Order of battle

Swedish forces
Swedish forces from left to right:
 Royal Majesty's Life Guards of Foot: 3 Battalions
 Skaraborg Regiment. 1 Battalion 
 Dalarna Regiment: 1 Battalion 
 Västgöta-Dals Regiment: 1 Battalion 
 Hälsinge Regiment: 1 Battalion
 Närke Regiment: 1 Battalion
 Norrland Regiment: 1 Battalion

Danish forces
Danish forces from left to right:
 Queen's Life Regiment: 2 Battalions
 Weyher's Infantry Regiment: 2 Battalions
 1 Battalion Groy
 1 Battalion Stuart
 Prins Georgs Regiment: 2 Battalions
 King's Regiment: 2 Battalions

Battle
Before daybreak the Swedish army broke camp and made preparations to cross the river. The Swedes had 2,000 infantry and 6,000 cavalry at their disposal; their Danish opponents had more than 5,000 infantry, 6,000 cavalry, in addition to 1,300 Dutch marines—in all, about 13,000 men. Under the cover of a moonless night, between 04:00 and 05:30, the entire Swedish force successfully crossed the river and reached the southern bank without alarming the Danes. The Swedes planned to attack the sleeping Danish camp with cavalry from the southeast. Reconnaissance patrols reported that the ground between the two armies was unsuitable for mounted troops, so King Charles XI and his generals gathered to discuss the new situation. Most advisers pointed out that it would be foolish to attack by foot as the Danish army possessed much more infantry and the Swedish main strength lay in its cavalry. Additionally, the Swedes would likely lose the element of surprise during the long march towards the Danish camp. The king was eager to attack at once, but was swayed by his advisers. He ordered the troops to advance towards the hills just outside the north wall of Lund, to seize a tactical advantage. The hills would mean better terrain for the cavalry and the town itself would cover the Swedish southern flank. By then the Danes had woken, and soon recognised the Swedish intentions. The Danes quickly broke camp and started to race the Swedes for control of the hills. The first skirmish was between the Swedish right wing and the Danish left wing, and ended in a draw. However, the hills were secured under Swedish control, and the Danes were pushed to the east.

The main battle began at 09:00, at sunrise. The front now stretched one kilometer from north to south, with the Danes to the east and the Swedes to the west. The Danish army was supported by 56 cannon of various calibers, while the Swedes brought only eight six-pounders and four three-pounders. Once the fighting commenced, Charles XI personally led a flanking maneuver to overwhelm the Danish left flank. During the fighting, the Danish commander Carl von Arensdorff was badly wounded, and the entire left wing was forced to retreat at 10:00, severely crippling the Danish army. Charles XI and Field Marshal Simon Grundel Helmfelt used their cavalry to pursue fleeing Danish troops and cut down any who lagged behind. The pursuit continued eight kilometers, right up to the river. Some officers at the Danish camp attempted to ward off the Swedes, but many Danes were forced onto the ice. The ice did not hold, and a great number of the remaining Danish left wing drowned.

While the Danish left wing fled, the right wing pushed the Swedes back until the Swedish left wing scattered. With the absence of Danish King Christian V and with General Arensdorff wounded, Friedrich von Arensdorff, the general's brother, had assumed command of the Danish army. The Danish front was now facing south and the Swedish forces found themselves under constant attack with their backs against the town wall. The situation for the Swedes was desperate, as there had been no sign of the king, the Household cavalry, or the Field Marshal for hours. The Swedes were also greatly outnumbered, with approximately 1,400 infantry and 2,500 cavalry, as the Danes approximately counted 4,500 infantry and 2,100 cavalry. However, instead of forcing the attack, Friedrich von Arensdorff ordered the army to regroup at noon, halting the battle.

At the river, the Swedish king was contemplating his next move. Available intelligence from the town was scarce, and suggested that the whole Danish army was on the run. Although he was tempted to rout the fleeing Danish cavalry all the way to Landskrona, he instead opted to return to Lund to his army.

The battle at Lund renewed, and the Swedes were forced back once more. At sunset (about 15:00) the Swedish king returned from the north with his cavalry, combined with some cavalry units from the scattered Swedish left wing. He decided to try to circle the Danish army to the west to join the remains of the Swedish center. Danish commander Arensdorff made the decision to halt the offensive on the Swedish center and instead tend to the enemy cavalry in the northwest.

Charles XI, two generals, and three guards broke through the Danish lines to join the diminished Swedish center. While Arensdorff was still attacking the cavalry in the north, the return of the Swedish king inspired the exhausted troops, who attacked the Danish forces in the back. Though the Danes still outnumbered the Swedes, by approximately 4,500 to 4,000, Arensdorff had lost the initiative and after half an hour his army disintegrated. Charles XI wanted to clear the field of Danish soldiers. The remaining Danish cavalry quickly disappeared into the night. Although Danish General Siegwert von Bibow protected the infantry retreat, many of the Danes were massacred until Field Marshal Helmfelt ordered the killing to  stop and the surrendering Danish and Dutch soldiers were spared. At 17:00 a ceasefire was sounded.

Aftermath

Although the bodies were counted the next day, the original notes have been lost and the exact death toll is unknown. Contemporary Swedish sources indicate that between 8,300 and 9,000 were buried, excluding the Danes that drowned and soldiers that died from their wounds over the following weeks; however, it is likely that the peasants burying the bodies inflated the reported numbers for economical reasons, as suggested by author Gustaf Björlin, or that they include soldiers that had died of sickness and other reasons prior to the battle. One contemporary Danish source talks about a total of 9,300 dead. More realistically, the total deaths on the battlefield amounted to between 3,000 and 4,000 men, of which about 1,000 or slightly more were Swedes. The Swedes also had 2,000 men severely wounded after the battle, and perhaps 500 or so lightly wounded. According to Danish sources, their army had but 5,000 serviceable men after the battle. Swedish sources, on the other hand, estimates that only 400 infantry and 2,500 Danish cavalry made it out unharmed; this number does not include artillery personnel or officers. At least 1,500 Danes had been captured and another 500 or so had been dispersed (of which many were subsequently killed or captured). The Dutch marines had been exceptionally unfortunate; according to various sources, only a few dozen out of the 1,300 survived. The battle severely crippled both armies, seeing as it was extremely bloody when taking into consideration the casualties in comparison to the total number of combatants.

The Swedish victory is often attributed to the composition of their army, as it contained far fewer mercenaries than the Danish army. The Swedish mix of cavalry and infantry made it possible for the Swedes to mount swift counterattacks as soon as a friendly infantry unit buckled. The Danish still used the caracole tactic, undermining the speed and agility of their cavalry.

The victory at Lund boosted the morale of the Swedish army. Charles XI was criticized for getting carried away by his success on the right flank, but the battle made him popular with his troops. The remaining Danish forces were forced to retreat to the fortress of Landskrona. Reinforced by their Austrian and German allies, they would once again meet the Swedish army at the Battle of Landskrona.

See also
 Scanian War
 History of Scania

 Notes, citations and sources 
Notes

Citations

Sources
 
Bjerg, Hans Christian; Frantzen, Ole L. Danmark i Krig (2005). 
Holm, Nils F. (Ed.) Det svenska svärdet (1948).
Isacsson, Claes-Göran. Skånska kriget 1675–1679 (2000).  
 
Slaget vid Lund (English Version,Swedish Version), Visit Lund'' Website, Retrieved Sep.1, 2017.

1676 in Sweden
Lund 1676
Lund 1676
Lund
Conflicts in 1676
Scanian War
17th century in Skåne County
Christian V of Denmark